The 2018 Dublin Senior Hurling Championship was the 131st staging of the Dublin Senior Hurling Championship since its establishment by the Dublin County Board in 1887. The championship began on 5 April 2018 and ended on 28 October 2018.

Cuala were the defending champions, defeating Kilmacud Crokes in the 2017 final and winning their third Dublin Senior Hurling Championship in a row.

Group stage

Group 1

Group 2

Group 3

Group 4

Quarter-finals

Semi-finals

Final

References

Dublin Senior Hurling Championship
Dublin Senior Hurling Championship